Nadia Dajani (born December 26, 1965) is an American actress. She hosts the baseball comedy web series Caught Off Base with Nadia.

Early life and education
Dajani was born in Los Angeles, California on December 26, 1965. She grew up the youngest of four children in Greenwich Village, New York City, and is of Irish and Palestinian ancestry. Dajani attended P.S. 41 elementary school, before attending I.S. 70 junior high school in New York City with fellow actor Liev Schreiber.

Acting career
From 1995 to 1997, Dajani starred as Amanda Moyer in the Fox sitcom Ned & Stacey for two seasons. She starred in numerous television pilots. She appeared on Emily's Reasons Why Not opposite Heather Graham and the Adult Swim cult hit Delocated, as well as successful appearances on Aaron Sorkin projects such as Tina Lake on Sports Night and as the First Lady's Chief of Staff, Lily Mays, on The West Wing.

Dajani has appeared in a variety of television episodes on such shows as Sex and the City ("Critical Condition") and its prequel The Carrie Diaries (where she played a completely different, yet more major, role), Ugly Betty, The King of Queens, Body of Proof, and Curb Your Enthusiasm, and starred in the CBS film The Lost Valentine alongside Betty White. She played Gerry Red Wilson's sister-in-law Catherine in ABC's That's Life in 1998. She had a recurring role on the Showtime series The Big C.

She has had roles in films such as This Is Not a Film, Flirting with Disaster, Happy Accidents, View from the Top, and the Edward Burns' film Sidewalks of New York.

Dajani is a founding member of Malaparte Theatre Company, whose artistic director was Ethan Hawke. In 1993 she appeared alongside Calista Flockhart, Ethan Hawke, Steve Zahn in an off-Broadway play, Sophistry. In 2002 Dajani appeared as Bev in Tom Donaghy's Boys and Girls.

She sings backing vocals on Jimmy Fallon's album The Bathroom Wall. Dajani appears in Brady Kiernan's 2011 romantic drama film Stuck Between Stations, alongside Josh Hartnett and Michael Imperioli. She had a recurring role on USA Network's Necessary Roughness. In 2011, Dajani appeared in the Body of Proof episode "Society Hill". The following year, she guest-starred in an episode of the CBS series The Good Wife.

Personal life

Dajani is an avid baseball fan. She has a baseball comedy web series titled Caught Off Base with Nadia. Her best friend is Beastie Boys' Adam Horovitz, the two met at P.S. 41 elementary school. She is married to New York City firefighter John F. Moore.

Filmography

References

External links
 
 Caught Off Base with Nadia

1965 births
20th-century American actresses
21st-century American actresses
Actresses from Los Angeles
Actresses from New York City
American film actresses
American people of Irish descent
American people of Palestinian descent
American television actresses
Living people
People from Greenwich Village